Antoine François Alfred Lacroix  (4 February 186312 March 1948) was a French mineralogist and geologist. He was born in Mâcon, Saône-et-Loire.

Education
Lacroix completed a D. s Sc. in Paris in 1889, as student of Ferdinand André Fouqué. Fouqué only agreed to the graduation if Lacroix would marry his daughter.

Career
In 1893, he was appointed professor of mineralogy at the Jardin des Plantes, Paris, and in 1896 director of the mineralogical laboratory in the École des Hautes Études.

He paid especial attention to minerals connected with volcanic phenomena and igneous rocks, to the effects of metamorphism, and to mineral veins, in various parts of the world, notably in the Pyrenees. In his numerous contributions to scientific journals he dealt with the mineralogy and petrology of Madagascar, and published an elaborate and exhaustive volume on the eruptions in Martinique, La Montagne Pelée et ses éruptions (Paris 1904).

He also issued an important work entitled Minéralogie de la France et de ses Colonies (1893–1898), and other works in conjunction with Auguste Michel-Lévy. He was president of the volcanology section (1922–1927) of the International Union of Geodesy and Geophysics (IUGG). He was elected member of the Académie des sciences in 1904. He was awarded the Penrose Medal in 1930.

Legacy
A species of Asian snake, Oligodon lacroixi, is named in his honor, as is the Lacroix Glacier in the Taylor Valley of Antarctica.

References

1863 births
1948 deaths
People from Mâcon
French geologists
French mineralogists
French volcanologists
Petrologists
Penrose Medal winners
Members of the French Academy of Sciences
Wollaston Medal winners
Foreign Members of the Royal Society
Foreign associates of the National Academy of Sciences
Foreign members of the Serbian Academy of Sciences and Arts